The olecranon fossa is a deep triangular depression on the posterior side of the humerus, superior to the trochlea. It provides space for the olecranon of the ulna during extension of the forearm.

Structure 
The olecranon fossa is located on the posterior side of the distal humerus.

The joint capsule of the elbow attaches to the humerus just proximal to the olecranon fossa.

Function 
The olecranon fossa provides space for the olecranon of the ulna during extension of the forearm, from which it gets its name.

Other animals 
The olecranon fossa is present in various mammals, including dogs.

Additional images

References

External links
 
 Photo of model at Waynesburg College skeleton3/olecranonfossa
 
 Imaging at umich.edu

Bones of the upper limb
Humerus